Agriades podarce, the arrowhead Arctic blue, gray blue or Sierra Nevada blue, is a butterfly in the family Lycaenidae. It is found in North America from southern Oregon to central California in the Klamath Range and the Sierra Nevada. The habitat consists of subalpine meadows.

The wingspan is 22–26 mm. The upperside of the males is gray blue, while females are red brown. The underside of the forewings has black arrowhead-shaped spots that point inward. The hindwings have a discal spot which is not black. Adults are on wing from June to September in one generation per year. They feed on flower nectar, including yellow composites and bistort.

The larvae feed on Dodecatheon jeffreyi.  Caterpillars or chrysalids hibernate.

Subspecies
Agriades podarce podarce
Agriades podarce cilla (Behr, 1867) (California)
Agriades podarce klamathensis J. Emmel & T. Emmel, 1998 (Oregon, California)

References

External links

podarce
Butterflies of North America
Butterflies described in 1865
Taxa named by Baron Cajetan von Felder
Taxa named by Rudolf Felder